Miguel Tavares may refer to:
 Miguel Tavares (volleyball) (born 1993), Portuguese volleyball player
 Miguel Tavares (footballer, born 1998), Portuguese footballer
 Miguel Tavares (footballer, born 1999), Portuguese footballer